Nadira Ait Oumghar (born ) is an Algerian female volleyball player. She is part of the Algeria women's national volleyball team. On club level she played for Seddouk Volleyball in 2015.

Club information
Current club :  Seddouk club Bejaia

References

External links
 Profile at FIVB.org

1994 births
Living people
Algerian women's volleyball players
Volleyball players from Béjaïa
Opposite hitters
21st-century Algerian people